Martina Nejedly (born 26 May 1975) is a former professional tennis player from Canada.

She is the younger sister of former tennis player Jana Nejedly.

Biography
Nejedly immigrated to Canada from Czechoslovakia at the age of four. The family fled the communist country while on vacation to Yugoslavia, settling in Vancouver.

On the professional tour, she reached a best ranking in singles of 179 in the world. Her WTA Tour main-draw appearances included the 1999 Canadian Open, where she was beaten in the first round by then-world No. 27, Nathalie Dechy, in three sets. In 1999, she appeared in four ties for the Canada Fed Cup team.

ITF Circuit finals

Singles: 6 (2–4)

Doubles: 1 (0–1)

See also
 List of Canada Fed Cup team representatives

References

External links
 
 
 

1975 births
Living people
Canadian female tennis players
Czechoslovak emigrants to Canada
Canadian people of Czech descent